This Generation is a collaboration album by American hip hop recording artists Murs and Fashawn, released on September 25, 2012 under Duck Down Music Inc. Production for the album was handled by the duo Beatnick & K-Salaam. Music videos were filmed for the singles "Slash Gordan", "This Generation", and "64 Impala".

Background and development 
Prior to the album's creation, Murs and Fashawn would frequently bump into each other on the road, although they had never worked with each other. As Murs began to plan out a new project with producers Beatnick & K-Salaam, the three of them expressed interest in doing a full collaboration album with Fashawn.

Initially, the album was going to be a double EP, with Murs taking half of the beats and Fashawn taking the other half. However, as the two began to work closely together, the project evolved into a more collaborative effort, with both artists vibing off each other's creative process.

Critical reception 

This Generation was met with acclaim from music critics.  XXL Magazine gave the album an XL rating, praising that "[Murs and Fashawn] feed off each other well, resulting in good music with a message. It’s unclear if the two will follow up this effort with another, but it seems like they should and sooner than later." Okayplayer stated, "Despite never collaborating before making this LP, Murs and Fashawn have done what few collaborative albums do: create a complete and cohesive album, that actually lives up to lofty expectations." HipHopDX gave the album 4 out of 5 stars, acknowledging that "Murs and Fashawn forge an exceptional chemistry on This Generation that more importantly doesn’t compromise their stylistic individuality." Fred Thomas of AllMusic said, "The sense of camaraderie and interplay between the two cuts across lines of age and experience."

Track listing

Charts

References

External links
 

2012 albums
Fashawn albums
Murs (rapper) albums